Ukraine participated in Eurovision Song Contest 2014 with the song "Tick-Tock" written by Mariya Yaremchuk and Sandra Bjurman. The song was performed by Mariya Yaremchuk. The Ukrainian broadcaster National Television Company of Ukraine (NTU) organised a national final in order to select the Ukrainian entry for the 2014 contest in Copenhagen, Denmark. Twenty entries competed in the national selection held on 21 December 2013 and "Tick-Tock" performed by Mariya Yaremchuk was selected as the winner following the combination of votes from a five-member jury panel and a public televote.

Ukraine was drawn to compete in the first semi-final of the Eurovision Song Contest which took place on 6 May 2014. Performing during the show in position 9, "Tick-Tock" was announced among the top 10 entries of the first semi-final and therefore qualified to compete in the final on 10 May. It was later revealed that Ukraine placed fifth out of the 16 participating countries in the semi-final with 118 points. In the final, Ukraine performed in position 1 and placed sixth out of the 26 participating countries with 113 points.

Background 

Prior to the 2014 contest, Ukraine had participated in the Eurovision Song Contest eleven times since its first entry in 2003, winning it in 2004 with the song "Wild Dances" performed by Ruslana. Following the introduction of semi-finals for the 2004, Ukraine had managed to qualify to final in every contest they participated in thus far. Ukraine had been the runner-up in the contest on two occasions: in 2007 with the song "Dancing Lasha Tumbai" performed by Verka Serduchka and in 2008 with the song "Shady Lady" performed by Ani Lorak. Ukraine's least successful result had been 19th place, which they achieved during the 2005, with the song "Razom nas bahato" performed by GreenJolly.

The Ukrainian national broadcaster, National Television Company of Ukraine (NTU), broadcasts the event within Ukraine and organises the selection process for the nation's entry. NTU confirmed their intentions to participate at the 2014 Eurovision Song Contest on 23 October 2013. In the past, the broadcaster had alternated between both internal selections and national finals in order to select the Ukrainian entry. Between 2011 and 2013, NTU had set up national finals with several artists to choose both the song and performer to compete at Eurovision for Ukraine, with both the public and a panel of jury members involved in the selection. The method was continued to select the 2014 Ukrainian entry.

Before Eurovision

Evrobachennya 2014 - Natsionalyni vidbir 
The Ukrainian national final took place on 21 December 2013 at the NTU Studios in Kyiv. The show was hosted by Timur Myroshnychenko and Tetiana Terekhova and broadcast on Pershyi Natsionalnyi as well as online via NTU's official website 1tv.com.ua and the official Eurovision Song Contest website eurovision.tv.

Format 
The selection of the competing entries for the national final and ultimately the Ukrainian Eurovision entry took place over two stages. In the first stage, artists and songwriters had the opportunity to apply for the competition by attending a scheduled audition. Twenty acts were selected and announced on 8 December 2013. The second stage was the televised final, which took place on 21 December 2013 and featured the twenty acts vying to represent Ukraine in Copenhagen. The winner was selected via the 50/50 combination of votes from a public televote and an expert jury. Both the public televote and the expert jury assigned scores ranging from 1 (lowest) to 12 (highest) and the entry that had the highest number of points following the combination of these scores was declared the winner. Viewers participating in the public televote had the opportunity to submit a single vote per phone number for each of the participating entries via SMS. In the event of a tie, the tie was decided in favour of the entry that received the highest score from the jury.

Competing entries 
Artists and composers had the opportunity to submit their entries between 23 October 2013 and 6 December 2013. Auditions were held on 7 December 2013 at the Novopecherski Lypky in Kyiv where a four-member selection panel consisting of Vlad Baginsky (music producer of NTU), Mikhail Nekrasov (composer and producer), Yevgeniy Feshak (general producer of Radio Lux.FM) and Volodymyr Kozlov (programme director of RU.Music) reviewed the 56 received submissions and shortlisted twenty entries to compete in the national final. On 8 December 2013, the twenty selected competing acts were announced along with the running order, which was decided during a draw that took place following the auditions on 7 December. Among the competing artists was Viktoria Petryk who represented Ukraine in the Junior Eurovision Song Contest 2008.

Final 
The final took place on 21 December 2013. Twenty entries competed and the winner, "Tick-Tock" performed by Mariya Yaremchuk, was selected through the combination of votes from a public televote and an expert jury. Ties were decided in favour of the entries that received higher scores from the jury. The jury panel consisted of Oleksandr Panteleymonov (general director of NTU), Vlad Baginsky (music producer of NTU), Yuriy Rybchynsky (poet), Yan Tabachnyk (composer) and Mikhail Nekrasov (composer and producer). 10,210 votes were registered by the televote during the show. In addition to the performances of the competing entries, 2011 Ukrainian Eurovision entrant Mika Newton, 2013 Ukrainian Eurovision entrant Zlata Ognevich, 2013 Ukrainian Junior Eurovision entrant Sofia Tarasova, Kamaliya, Masha Sobko, Matias and Natalia Buchynska performed as guests.

Controversy
Following Mariya Yaremchuk's victory at the Ukrainian national final, several participants launched a protest against the final results, alleging that the phone lines for their entries were blocked while the phone line for Yaremchuk remained open. Olena Mozgova, the producer of Volodymyr Tkachenko, challenged the legitimacy of the results and planned to take legal action; similar complaints were also launched by Viktoria Petryk and the duo neAngely regarding the results of the public vote.

Preparation 
The official music video of "Tick-Tock", directed by Serhiy Knyazev and produced by Alternatyva Company, was released on 17 March. A revamped version of the song, featuring new arrangement and lyrics written by Mariya Yaremchuk in cooperation with Sandra Bjurman, was also featured in the music video.

Promotion 
Mariya Yaremchuk made several appearances across Europe to specifically promote "Tick-Tock" as the Ukrainian Eurovision entry. On 7 February, Yaremchuk performed an alternate version of "Tick-Tock" during the semi-final of the Maltese Eurovision national final. On 5 April, Yaremchuk performed during the Eurovision in Concert event which was held at the Melkweg venue in Amsterdam, Netherlands and hosted by Cornald Maas and Sandra Reemer. On 13 April, Yaremchuk performed during the London Eurovision Party, which was held at the Café de Paris venue in London, United Kingdom and hosted by Nicki French and Paddy O'Connell. On 25 and 26 April, Mariya Yaremchuk took part in promotional activities in Greece which included television and radio appearances, as well as performing during an event organised by OGAE Greece and held at the Shamone Club in Athens.

At Eurovision
According to Eurovision rules, all nations with the exceptions of the host country and the "Big Five" (France, Germany, Italy, Spain and the United Kingdom) are required to qualify from one of two semi-finals in order to compete for the final; the top ten countries from each semi-final progress to the final. The European Broadcasting Union (EBU) split up the competing countries into six different pots based on voting patterns from previous contests, with countries with favourable voting histories put into the same pot. On 20 January 2014, a special allocation draw was held which placed each country into one of the two semi-finals, as well as which half of the show they would perform in. Ukraine was placed into the first semi-final, to be held on 6 May 2014, and was scheduled to perform in the second half of the show.

Once all the competing songs for the 2014 contest had been released, the running order for the semi-finals was decided by the shows' producers rather than through another draw, so that similar songs were not placed next to each other. Ukraine was set to perform in position 9, following the entry from Azerbaijan and before the entry from Belgium.

In Ukraine, both the semi-finals and the final were broadcast on Pershyi Natsionalnyi with commentary by Timur Miroshnychenko and Tetiana Terekhova. The three shows were also broadcast via radio on UR-2 with commentary by Olena Zelinchenko. The Ukrainian spokesperson, who announced the Ukrainian votes during the final, was 2013 Ukrainian representative Zlata Ognevich.

Semi-final 
Mariya Yaremchuk took part in technical rehearsals on 29 April and 2 May, followed by dress rehearsals on 5 and 6 May. This included the jury show on 5 May where the professional juries of each country watched and voted on the competing entries.

The Ukrainian performance featured Mariya Yaremchuk performing on stage in a long dark blue dress with black leather ribbons designed by Hanna Osmekhina together with a dancer and four backing vocalists. The performance featured the dancer performing acrobatic choreography on a large running wheel that symbolised the real living tick-tock mechanism of a clock and the atmosphere of love. The performance also featured the use of a wind machine with a night starry sky as well as images of clocks and cog wheels appearing on the LED screens. The stage director and choreographer for the Ukrainian performance was the director of the ballet "Freedom" Olena Kolyadenko. The dancer that joined Mariya Yaremchuk on stage was Igor Kuleshyn, while the four backing vocalists were Anna Linnea, Graciela Chin A Loi, Anneli Maria Tornkvist and Elin Eva Maria Svensson.

At the end of the show, Ukraine was announced as having finished in the top 10 and subsequently qualifying for the grand final. It was later revealed that Ukraine placed fifth in the semi-final, receiving a total of 118 points.

Final 
Shortly after the first semi-final, a winners' press conference was held for the ten qualifying countries. As part of this press conference, the qualifying artists took part in a draw to determine which half of the grand final they would subsequently participate in. This draw was done in the order the countries were announced during the semi-final. Ukraine was drawn to compete in the first half. Following this draw, the shows' producers decided upon the running order of the final, as they had done for the semi-finals. Ukraine was subsequently placed to perform in position 1, before the entry from Belarus.

Mariya Yaremchuk once again took part in dress rehearsals on 9 and 10 May before the final, including the jury final where the professional juries cast their final votes before the live show. Mariya Yaremchuk performed a repeat of her semi-final performance during the final on 10 May. Ukraine placed sixth in the final, scoring 113 points.

Voting 
Voting during the three shows consisted of 50 percent public televoting and 50 percent from a jury deliberation. The jury consisted of five music industry professionals who were citizens of the country they represent, with their names published before the contest to ensure transparency. This jury was asked to judge each contestant based on: vocal capacity; the stage performance; the song's composition and originality; and the overall impression by the act. In addition, no member of a national jury could be related in any way to any of the competing acts in such a way that they cannot vote impartially and independently. The individual rankings of each jury member were released shortly after the grand final.

Following the release of the full split voting by the EBU after the conclusion of the competition, it was revealed that Ukraine had placed eighth with the public televote and twelfth with the jury vote in the final. In the public vote, Ukraine scored 112 points, while with the jury vote, Ukraine scored 78 points. In the first semi-final, Ukraine placed fifth with the public televote with 119 points and sixth with the jury vote, scoring 88 points.

Below is a breakdown of points awarded to Ukraine and awarded by Ukraine in the first semi-final and grand final of the contest, and the breakdown of the jury voting and televoting conducted during the two shows:

Voting Points awarded to Ukraine

Points awarded by Ukraine

Detailed voting results
The following members comprised the Ukrainian jury:
  (jury chairperson)composer
 Kateryna Komarproducer, vocal teacher
 Kostiantyn Mishukovproducer, DJ
 singer, composer
 Olena Valovyksinger

References

2014
Countries in the Eurovision Song Contest 2014
Eurovision
Articles containing video clips